Dielsdorf railway station is a railway station in the Swiss canton of Zurich and municipality of Dielsdorf. The station is located on the Wehntal railway line, and is served by Zurich S-Bahn line S15.

The station was opened in 1865, and was initially the terminus of a branch of the Bülach-Regensberg Railway from Oberglatt. The line was extended by the Swiss Northeastern Railway as part of their Wehntal line to Niederweningen in 1891, and Dielsdorf became a through station.

Services 
The following services stop at Dielsdorf:

References

External links 
 
 

Dielsdorf
Dielsdorf